Sonny Rollins and Thelonious Monk [Quartet] is a 10" LP by American jazz pianist and composer Thelonious Monk, performed by a quartet featuring Rollins and Monk. It was originally released in 1954 as the fifth of five 10" LPs featuring Monk for Prestige (PrLP 190). (The word "Quartet" appeared in the title only on the label.) Its contents were later split between the two 12-inch albums Thelonious Monk and Sonny Rollins and the Sonny Rollins album Moving Out. It has rarely been re-released in its original format, although it was included in a boxed set by Craft Records in a limited edition in 2017.

Track listing
Side A:
 "The Way You Look Tonight" (As "The Way You Blow Tonight") (Dorothy Fields, Jerome Kern) – 5:13
 "I Want to Be Happy" (Irving Caesar, Vincent Youmans) – 7:43
Side B:
 "More Than You Know" (Edward Eliscu, Billy Rose, Vincent Youmans) - 10:48

Notes
Recorded at Rudy Van Gelder Studio in Hackensack, NJ, on October 25, 1954.

Personnel
Sonny Rollins – tenor saxophone
Thelonious Monk  – piano
Tommy Potter  – bass
Art Taylor  – drums

References

Thelonious Monk albums
1954 albums
Prestige Records albums